Niels Otto Raasted (born in Copenhagen, 26 November 1888; died there on 31 December 1966) was a Danish composer and organist at Copenhagen Cathedral. He was founder and leader of the Danish Bach Association from 1925-1945 and his choral works are strongly influenced by Bach, Reger and Renaissance music.

He studied at the Copenhagen Conservatory and with Max Reger in Leipzig.

Works, editions and recordings
 Sonatas for solo violin op.18 Nr.1-3 & op.30 Nr.1 & 2 Johannes Soe Hansen, Dacapo Records, 2010
 Recording information

References

 Danish Composer Webpage 

1888 births
1966 deaths